Abhijit Deshmukh is the James J. Solberg Head of Industrial Engineering at Purdue University in Indiana, United States. He has made significant contributions to manufacturing, decision-making and complex systems.

Deshmukh received his doctorate degree from Purdue University in 1993, working with professors Moshe M. Barash and Joseph J. Talavage.

References

American industrial engineers
Living people
Year of birth missing (living people)
Purdue University faculty